Meningeal nerve may refer to:
 Middle meningeal nerve
 Meningeal branch of the mandibular nerve